Black Fury may refer to:

 Black Fury (comics), several fictional comic book characters
 Black Fury (film), a 1935 American crime film starring Paul Muni
 Black Fury (novel), an historical novel by Michael Musmanno

See also
Miss Fury